Vitaliy Postranskyi (born 2 August 1977 in Ivano-Frankivsk) is a Ukrainian goalkeeper. He last played for Ukrainian side FC Zorya Luhansk.

References

External links
 
 

1977 births
Living people
Ukrainian footballers
Sportspeople from Ivano-Frankivsk
FC Halychyna Drohobych players
FC Haray Zhovkva players
FC Lviv (1992) players
FC Metalurh Zaporizhzhia players
FC Kryvbas Kryvyi Rih players
FC Vorskla Poltava players
SC Tavriya Simferopol players
FC Volyn Lutsk players
FC Zorya Luhansk players
Simurq PIK players
Association football goalkeepers
Ukrainian Premier League players
Ukrainian expatriate footballers
Expatriate footballers in Azerbaijan
Ukrainian expatriate sportspeople in Azerbaijan
Expatriate footballers in Russia
Ukrainian expatriate sportspeople in Russia
FC Rotor Volgograd players